Ludwick is a surname of German origin, and may refer to:

Andrew K. Ludwick (born 1946), American businessman
Christopher Ludwick (1720–1801), American baker
Eric Ludwick (born 1971), American baseball player
Robert Ludwick-Forster (born 1968), American  engineer and scholar of religious studies
Ryan Ludwick (born 1978), American baseball player
Tessa Ludwick (born 1988), American actress

See also
 Lodwick, surname
 Ludvig, given name
 Ludwig (given name)
 Ludwik, given name

German-language surnames